Assad Al Hamlawi (born 27 October 2000) is a Swedish-Palestinian football striker who plays for Jönköpings Södra IF on loan from Helsingborgs IF.

References

2000 births
Living people
Swedish footballers
Association football forwards
Ängelholms FF players
Helsingborgs IF players
Jönköpings Södra IF players
Ettan Fotboll players
Allsvenskan players
Superettan players